Dollison is a surname. Notable people with the surname include:

 Arthur M. Dollison (1909–1983), American prison administrator
 Nani Dollison (born 1953), American poker player

See also
 Cash McCall (musician), born Maurice Dollison Jr.